Edwin Bhend (born 9 September 1931) is a Swiss chess player and author. He was awarded the International Master title in 1960, and won the Swiss championship in 1966. He represented Switzerland in 10 Chess Olympiads from 1952 to 1982. At Zürich in 1959, he finished in a tie for 10th place behind future world champions Mikhail Tal and Bobby Fischer, but defeated Tal in the opening round after defending accurately in a complicated position. He is still an active player.

References

External links

1931 births
Living people
Swiss chess players
Chess International Masters
Chess Olympiad competitors